Robert Randall Johnson (born January 2, 1953) is a former American football offensive guard who played two seasons with the Tampa Bay Buccaneers of the National Football League (NFL). He was drafted by the Seattle Seahawks in the fourth round of the 1976 NFL Draft. He played college football at the University of Georgia and attended Pepperell High School in Lindale, Georgia. Johnson was a consensus All-American in 1975. He was also a member of the Edmonton Eskimos of the Canadian Football League.

Early years
Johnson participated in high school football, wrestling, basketball, baseball and track at Pepperell High School. He was an All-area fullback and middle guard in football. The football team was 9-1 his senior year. He won the unlimited weight division in the Northwest Georgia High School wrestling tournament in 1970 and 1971. Johnson was the Region 7AA Champion in the unlimited weight division in 1970 as well. In 1971, he was the state champion of Georgia High School wrestling in the unlimited division. He was the runner-up in the state his junior year. Johnson participated in the State Track and Field competition in discus and shot put in 1971. He was also a letterman in basketball and baseball. He was inducted into the Rome-Floyd Sports Hall of Fame in 1977.

College career
Johnson played for the Georgia Bulldogs from 1971 to 1975. He was redshirted in 1972. He was a three-year starter and letterman from 1973 to 1975. Johnson was named to the Gridiron News All-SEC team and played in the Peach Bowl in 1973. He was named to the Pre-Season All-American Team, played in the Tangerine Bowl and earned UPI All-SEC honors in 1974. He was named to the Pre-Season All-American Team, earned AP and UPI All-SEC honors and garnered consensus All-American recognition his senior season in 1975. Johnson was also named Offensive Lineman of the Year by the Atlanta Touchdown Club, Southeastern Conference Lineman of the Year by the Birmingham Monday Morning Quarterback Club and College Offensive Lineman of the Year by the 100% Wrong Club. He was awarded the Jacobs Blocking Trophy for being the best blocker in the SEC, the William K. Jenkins Award as Georgia's best lineman and the Whitworth Memorial Trophy by the Muscogee County Bulldog Club for being Georgia's outstanding lineman in 1975. He was the offensive captain of the 1975 Bulldogs team. Johnson also played in the Cotton Bowl, Hula Bowl, the first Japan Bowl and the Coaches All-America Game in 1975. He took classes at Floyd Junior College and then finished his degree at Georgia in 1984.

Professional career

Seattle Seahawks
Johnson was selected by the Seattle Seahawks with the 122nd pick in the 1976 NFL Draft. He was released by the Seahawks in September 1976 before the start of the 1976 season.

Tampa Bay Buccaneers
Johnson signed with the Tampa Bay Buccaneers in 1977. He played in 22 games, starting one, for the Buccaneers from 1977 to 1978. He suffered a back injury and was later released by the Buccaneers in 1979.

Edmonton Eskimos
Johnson spent a month with the Edmonton Eskimos in 1980 before retiring from football.

Coaching career
Johnson spent time as an assistant football coach at Coosa High School in Rome, Georgia. He also coached at Pepperell High School where the team won the State championship in 1990. He then was head coach at Model High School and then returned to Pepperell. He ended his career at Cartersville where he retired.

Impostor
An impostor claiming to be Johnson played for the Orlando Americans of the American Football Association in 1981. The impostor was Robert Lee Johnson, who stole Randy Johnson's identity in an effort to improve his odds of making the Americans squad.

References

External links
Just Sports Stats

Living people
1953 births
American football offensive guards
American players of Canadian football
Canadian football offensive linemen
Edmonton Elks players
Georgia Bulldogs football players
Tampa Bay Buccaneers players
All-American college football players
High school football coaches in Georgia (U.S. state)
Sportspeople from Rome, Georgia
Players of American football from Georgia (U.S. state)
Identity theft victims